This is a list of current and former automobile manufacturers of France.

Current manufacturers

Former manufacturers

A
 AAA (1919–1920)
 Able (1920–1927)
 AC3 (1998–2002)
 Ader (1900–1907)
 AER (1930)
 AEM(1920–1924)
 Aérocaréne (1947)
 Ageron (1910–1914)
 Ailloud (1898–1904)
 Ajams (1920)
 Ajax (1913–1919)
 AL (1907–1909)
 Alamagny (1947–1948)
 Alba (1913–1928)
 Albatros (1912)
 Alcyon (1906–1929)
 Alda (1912–1922)
 Allard-Latour (1899–1902)
 Alliance (1905–1908)
 Alphi (1929–1931)
 Alma (1926–1927)
 Alva (1913–1923)
 AM (1906–1915)
 Amédée Bollée (1885–1921)
 Amilcar (1921–1939)
 Ampère (1906–1909)
 Anderson Electric (1912)
 Andre Py (1899)
 Antoinette (1906–1907)
 Arbel (1951–1959) also known as Loubiére, Loubiéres, -Arbel, or -Paris
 Ardent (1900–1901)
 Ardex (1934–c.1937; 1952–1955)
 Ariane (1907)
 Ariès (1903–1938)
 Arista (1912–1915)
 Arista (1952–1967)
 Arola (1976–1983)
 Arzac (1926–1927)
 AS (1924–1928)
 ASS (1919–1920)
 Astatic (1920–1922)
 Aster (1900–1910)
 Astra (1922)
 Astresse (1898)
 Ateliers d’Automobiles et d’Aviation (AAA) (1919–1920)
 Ateliers de Construction Mecanique l'Aster (1890s–1912)
 Atla (1957–1959)
 Atlas (1951)
 Audibert & Lavirotte (1894–1901)
 Auge (1898–c.1901)
 Austral (1907)
 Autobleu (1953–1957)
 Automoto (1901–1907)
 Avions Voisin (1905–1946)
 Avolette (1955–1959)

B
 Ballot (1921–1932)
 Barré (1899–1930)
 Beck (1920–1922)
 Bédélia (1910–1925)
 Bellanger (1912–1925)
 Bel Motors (1976–1980)
 Benjamin (1921–1931)
 Berliet (1895–1939)
 Bernardet (1946–1950)
 Bignan (1918–1930)
 Blériot (1921–1922)
 BNC (1923–1931)
 Boitel (1946–1949)
 Bolide (1899–1907)
 Bonnet (1961–1964)
 Borderel-Cail
 Bouquet, Garcin & Schivre/BGS (1899–1906)
 Brasier (1905–1926)
 Brouhot (1898–1911)
 Bucciali (1922–1933)
 Buchet (1910–1930)
 Bugatti (1909–1963)
 Butterosi (1919–1924)

C
 Cambier (1897–c.1905)
 Castoldi (1900)
 Cedre (1975–1987)
 CD (1962–1965)
 CG (Chappe et Gessalin) (1966–1974)
 CGV (Charron, Girardot et Voigt) (1901–1906)
 Chaigneau-Brasier (1926–1930)
 Chainless (1900–1903)
 Charlon (1905–1906)
 Charron (1907–1930)
 Chenard-Walcker (1900–1946)
 CHS (1945–1946)
 Claveau (1923–1956)
 Clément-Bayard (1903–1922)
 Coadou et Fleury (1921–c.1935)
 Cochotte (1899)
 Cognet de Seynes (1912–1926)
 Cohendet (1898–1914)
 Colda (1921–1922)
 Constantinesco (1926–1928)
 Corre (1901–1907)
 Cottereau (1898–1910)
 Cottin & Desgouttes (1905–1931)
 Cournil (1960–1984)
 Couteret (1907)
 Couverchel (1905–1907)
 Créanche (1899–1906)
 Crespelle (1906–1923)
 Croissant (1920–1922)
 Culmen (c.1909)

D
 Dalifol (1896)
 Dalifol & Thomas (1896–1898)
 Damaizin & Pujos (1910)
 Dangel (1968–1971)
 Danvignes (1937–1939)
 Darl'mat (1936–1950)
 Darmont (1921–1939)
 Darracq (1896–1920)
 Le Dauphin (1941–1942)
 David & Bourgeois (1898)
 DB (1938–1961)
 De Bazelaire (1908–1928)
 De Cezac (1922–1927)
 De Dietrich (1897–1905)
 De Dion-Bouton (1883–1932)
 De Marcay (1920–1922)
 De Riancey (1898–c.1901)
 De Sanzy (1924)
 Decauville (1898–1910)
 Deguingand (1927–1930)
 Deho (1946–1948)
 Delage (1905–1953)
 Delahaye (1895–1954)
 Delaugère et Clayette (1864–1934)
 Delamare-Deboutteville (1883–1887)
 Delaugère (1898–1926)
 Delaunay-Belleville (1904–1948)
 Delfosse (1922–1926)
 Demeester (1906–1914)
 De Boisse (1901–1904)
 Derby (1921–1936)
 Desmoulins (1920–1923)
 Dewald (1902–1926)
 Dinin Alfred 1904
 DFP (1906–1926)
 Diederichs (1912–1914)
 Dolo (1947–1948)
 Donnet (1928–1936)
 Donnet-Zedel (1924–1928)
 Dumas (1902–1903)
 Dumont (1912–1913)
 Duport (1977–1994)
 D’Yrsan (1923–1930)

E
 E.H.P. (1921–1929)
 Electricar (1919–1924)
 Elfe (1920–1925)
 Elgé (1868–1942)
 Elysée (1921–1925)
 Enders (1911–1923)
 Esculape (1899)
 Eudelin (c.1905–1908)
 Eureka (1906–1909)

F
 Facel Vega (1954–1964)
 FAL (1907)
 Farman (1919–1931)
 Favier (c.1925–1930)
 FL (1909–1914)
Ford SAF (1916–1954)
 Fonlupt (1920–1922)
 Fouillaron (1900–1914)
 Fournier (1913–1924)

G
 Galy (1954–1957)
 Galba (1929–1930)
 Gardner-Serpollet (1900–1907)
 Gautier–Wehrlé (1894–1900)
 Georges Irat (1921–1953)
 Georges Richard (1897–1902)
 Georges Roy (1906–1929)
 Gillet-Forest (1900–1907)
 Gladiator (1896–1920)
 Gobron-Brillié (1898–1930)
 Gordini (1951–1957)
 Goujon (1896–1901)
 GRAC (1964–1974)
 Gregoire (1904–1924)
 Grillet (Company name. Cars sold under the name "Ryjan") (1920–1926)
 Grivel (1897)
 Guerraz (1901)
 Guerry et Bourguignon (1907)
 Guyot Spéciale (1925–1931)

H
 Hanzer (1899–1903)
 Hautier (1899–1905)
 Hédéa (1912–24)
 Heinis (1925–1930)
 Helbé (1905–1907)
 Henou (1923)
 Henry Bauchet (1903)
 Henry-Dubray (1901)
 Hérald (1901–1906)
 Hinstin (1921–1926)
 Hispano-Suiza (1911–1938)
 Hommell (1994–2003)
 Hotchkiss (1903–1955)
 Hrubon (1980–1988)
 Hurtu (1896–1930)

I
 Inaltera (1976–1978)
 Induco (1921–1924)
 Inter (1953–1956)

J
 J-P Wimille (1948–1949)
 Jack Sport (1925–1930)
 Janémian (1920–1923)
 Janoir (1921–1922)
 Janvier (1903–1904)
 Jean-Bart (1907)
 Jean Gras (1924–1927)
 Jeantaud (1893–1906)
 JG Sport (1922–1923)
 Jidé (1969–1974; 1977–1981)
 Jouffret (1920–1926)
 Jousset (1924–1928)
 Jouvie (1913–1914)
 Julien (1946–1949)
 Juzan (1897)

K
 Kevah (1920–1924)
 Koch (1898–1901)
 Korn et Latil (1901–1902)
 Kriéger (1897–1908)
 KVS (1976–c.1984)

L
 La Buire (1904–1930)
 La Confortable (c.1920)
 Lacoste & Battmann (1897–1910)
 Lafitte (1923–1924)
 Lahaussois (1907)
 Landulet (2014)
 La Licorne (1907–1950)
 L'Alkolumine (1899)
 La Lorraine (1899–1902)
 Lambert (1926–1953)
 La Nef (c.1901–1914)
 La Perle (1913–1927)
 La Ponette (1909–1925)
 La Radieuse (1907)
 L'Ardennais (1901–c.1903)
 La Roulette (1912–1914)
 La Va Bon Train (1904–1914)
 Lavie (c.1904)
 Le Blon (1898)
 Le Cabri (1924–1925)
 Le Favori (1921–1924)
 Léon Bollée (1896–1931)
 Le Piaf (1951–1952)
 Le Pratic (1908)
 Le Roitelet (1921–1924)
 Leyat (1919–1927)
 Le Zèbre (1909–1931)
 Linon (1900–1914)
 Lion-Peugeot (1905–1915)
 Lombard (1927–1929)
 Lorraine-Dietrich (1905–1934)
 Louis Chenard (1920–1932)
 Luc Court (1899–1936)
 Lufbery (1898–c.1902)
 Lurquin-Coudert (1907–1914)
 Lutier (1907)
 Luxior (1912–1914)

M
 Madoz (1921)
 Maillard (1900–c.1903)
 Maison Parisienne (1897–c.1898)
 Majola (1911–1928)
 Major (1920–1923; 1932)
 Malicet et Blin (M&B, MAB) (1897–c.1903)
 Malliary (1901)
 Marathon (1953–1955)
 Marbais and Lasnier (1906)
 Marcadier (1963–1983)
 Marden (1975–1992)
 Margaria (1910–1912)
 Marguerite (1922–1928)
 Marie de Bagneux (1907)
 Marot-Gardon (1899–1904)
 Marsonetto (1957–1959; 1965–1972)
 Matford (1934–1940)
 Mathis (1919–1935; 1945–1950)
 Matra (1965–1984)
 Messier (1924–1931)
 Mia (2011-2014)
 Michel Irat (1929–1930)
 Mildé (1898–1909)
 Millot (1901–1902)
 MLB (1894–1902)
 Mochet (1924–1958)
 Mom (1906–1907)
 Monet (1920–1939)
 Monica (1971–1975)
 Monnard (1899)
 Monocar (1936–1939)
 Monotrace (1924–1930)
 Montier (1920–1934)
 Montier & Gillet (1895–1898)
 Morisse (1899–1914)
 Mors (1895–1925; 1941–1943)
 Motobloc (1901–1930)
 Mototri Contal (1907–1908)
 MPM Motors (2015-2021)
 Mutel (1902-1906)

N
 Nanceene (1900–c.1903)
 Napoleon (1903)
 Naptholette (1899)
 Nardini (1914)

O
 Obus (1907–1908)
 Octo (1921–1928)
 Oméga-Six (1922–1930)
 Otto (1900–1914)
 Ours (1906–1909)

P
 Panhard/Panhard & Levassor (1890–1967)
 Patin (1899–1900)
 Pilain (1896–1920)
 Plasson (1910)
 Poinard (1951–1953)
 Ponts-Moteurs (1912–1913)
 Populaire (1899)
 Poron (1898)
 Porthos (1906–1914)
 Prod'homme (1907–1908)
 Prosper-Lambert (1901–1906)
 Peugeot (1896)

Q
 Quo Vadis (1921–1923)

R
 Radior (1920–1922)
 Rally (1921–1933)
 Raouval (1899–1902)
 Ratier (1926–1930)
 Ravailler (1907)
 Ravel (1900–1902)
 Ravel (1923–1929)
 Rebour (1905–1908)
 Reyonnah (1950–1954)
 Reyrol (1900–1930)
 Richard-Brasier (1902–1905)
 Robert Serf (1925–1935)
 Rochet-Schneider (1894–1932)
 Roger (1888–1896)
 Rolland-Pilain (1907–1931)
 Rolux (1938–1952)
 Rosengart (1928–1955)
 Roussel (1908–1914)
 Roussey (1949–1951)
 Rouxel (1899–1900)
 Rovin (1946–1951)
 Ruby (1910–c.1922)
 Ryjan (1920–1926)

S
 Salmson (1921–1957)
 Sandford (1923–1939)
 Santax (1920–1927)
 SARA (1923–1930)
 Sautter-Harlé (1907–1912)
 SCAP (1912–1929)
 SCAR (1906–1915)
 Scora (1974–present)
 Secqueville-Hoyau (1919–1924)
 Sénéchal (1921–1927)
 Sensaud de Lavaud (1926–1928)
 SERA (1959–1961)
 Sidéa (1912–1924)
 Sigma (1913–1928)
 Silva-Coroner (1927)
 SIMA-Violet (1924–1929)
 Simca (1935–1980)
 Simplicia (1910)
 Simplex (1919–1921)
 Sinpar (1907–1914)
 Siscart (1908–1909)
 Sixcyl (1907–1908)
 Sizaire-Berwick (1913–1927)
 Sizaire Frères (1923–1929)
 Sizaire-Naudin (1905–1921)
 Société Parisienne
 Soncin (1900–1902)
 Solanet (1921)
 Soriano-Pedroso (1919–1924)
 SOVAM (1965–1969)
 SPAG (1927–1928)
 Stabilia (1907–1930)
 Stimula (1907–1914)
 Stimula (1978–1982)
 Suère (1909–1931)
 Suncar (1980–c.1986)

T
 Talbot (1919–1932; 1979–1986)
 Talbot-Lago (1932–1959)
 Th. Schneider (1910–1931)
 Thomson (1913–1928)
 Tourey (1898)
 Tracford (1933–1935)
 Tracta (1926–1934)
 Triouleyre (1896–1898)
 Tuar (1913–1925)
 Turcat-Méry (1899–1928)
 Turgan-Foy (1899–1906)

U
 Unic (1904–1939)
 Underberg (?–?)s:Popular Science Monthly/Volume 57/October 1900/Gasoline Automobiles
 Urric (1905–1906)
 Utilis (1921–1924)

V
 Vaillant (1922–1924)
 Vallée (1895–1902)
 VELAM
 Vermorel (1908–1930 as an automobile producer)
 Vernandi (1928–1929)
 Villard (1925–1935)
 Vinot-Deguingand (1901–1927)
 Voisin

Z
 Zédel (1905–1920)
 Zeiller & Fournier (1920–1924)
 Zénia (1913–1924)

List of defunct microcar manufacturers
 Acma (1957-1961)
 Acoma mini comtesse (1974-1984)

References

 G.N. Georgano, Nick (Ed.). The Beaulieu Encyclopedia of the Automobile. Chicago: Fitzroy Dearborn Publishers, 2000.
 Šuman-Hreblay, Marián. Automobile Manufacturers Worldwide Directory. London: McFarland & Co. Inc., 2000.1254

Lists of automobile manufacturers
Cars
Automotive industry in France